HMS Surprise is the third historical novel in the Aubrey–Maturin series by Patrick O'Brian, first published in 1973. The series follows the partnership of Captain Jack Aubrey and the naval surgeon Stephen Maturin during the wars against Napoleon's France.

Maturin is tortured gathering intelligence. On HMS Surprise, Aubrey and Maturin make a long voyage to bring an ambassador to Southeast Asia, rounding the southern tip of Africa.

Some reviewers found the novel with "superb depictions of life", yet too full of nautical detail, while others found that detail part of the author's erudition and not in the way of the plot. The author showed "capacity for creating another completely believable world", while another reviewer said the novel is "stretching its genre [naval adventure] but never escaping it."

Plot summary
A convoy including Aubrey seizes the ships carrying the gold deemed necessary by Spain to agree to join the war on the side of France. On the quibble that Spain had not yet entered the war, the new First Lord of the Admiralty decides the vast sum is a droit of the Crown so thus not shared out with the captors. Smaller amounts will be distributed to the captains, quite opposite to the expectations of the successful convoy. The First Lord blunders into mentioning the name of intelligence agent Stephen Maturin during the proceedings, putting Maturin at risk.

Maturin goes on a mission to Spain and is to be picked up at Port Mahon by Aubrey, now on blockade duty near Toulon in HMS Lively. At the rendezvous point, Aubrey learns from a Catalan revolutionary that his friend has been captured and is being tortured by French intelligence in Port Mahon, the island having been returned to Spain in the Peace of Amiens. Aubrey leads a rescue mission, saving a ravaged Maturin and killing all of the French interrogators except one, Captain Dutourd. In England, Aubrey is taken by bailiffs and is held in a sponging-house, a debtors' prison. Maturin tells Sir Joseph of his capture and Aubrey's predicament. Aubrey's marriage to Sophia Williams is deferred, as her mother insists that he be debt-free. Maturin gets Aubrey an advance on his grant of money and he is released. Sophia meets Aubrey in a coach in the middle of the night before he takes command of his new ship HMS Surprise, and they promise to marry no one else.

Aubrey and Maturin leave in the Surprise to ferry an ambassador to the Sultan of Kampong on the Malay Peninsula. Aubrey hopes to find the French squadron commanded by Admiral Linois, who once took him prisoner. Surprise is caught in the doldrums north of the equator, and the crew show signs of scurvy. On a very hot Sunday, Maturin takes a short stop on St Paul's Rock. Two serious storms strike; the officer who rowed him out is drowned and Surprise is damaged and driven out of sight. Maturin survives on bird-fouled water and the blood of boobies and claims that these days under the hot sun have restored his health after the torture. They stop along the coast of Brazil for fresh foods and supplies, and a sloth; this is Maturin's first time in the New World. They put in at Rio for mail.

Refitted and repainted, Surprise goes wide around the Cape of Good Hope, held by the Dutch who are allied with Napoleon. In the waters of the Antarctic Ocean, they endure a severe storm. The ambassador becomes very ill. They put into Bombay in India to refit after the storms and to rest the ambassador. Maturin meets a local street-wise child, a girl named Dil, who eagerly shows him around the city. Maturin is watching a parade with Dil when he sees Diana Villiers, who has returned to Bombay ahead of her companion, Richard Canning. They agree to visit, and spend several days together, at the end of which Maturin asks her to marry him. She does not reply immediately but promises she will when Surprise stops in Calcutta. Maturin finds Dil dead and robbed of the silver bracelets that he had given her; he supervises her cremation on the shore.

The ambassador dies before reaching the Sunda Strait so the Surprise sets sail for Britain. They encounter the East India Company's China Fleet, returning to England unescorted. A day after leaving the China Fleet the Surprise spots Linois's squadron in the Indian Ocean. Surprise engages its smallest ship, the corvette Berceau, shredding her rigging, then speeds back to the China Fleet to warn them and organise a defence. Choosing the largest ships of the China Fleet, Aubrey dresses them as men-of-war and sends some of his officers to help them fight. The French squadron closes on the Surprise and the large Indiamen. The Surprise engages the largest French warship, the Marengo; she is outgunned and in peril when one of the Indiamen engages the French ship from the other side, forcing Marengo to disengage. Damage forces the French squadron to abandon the chase to refit.

Ashore in Calcutta, Aubrey receives an enthusiastic welcome from the merchants, including Canning, who are happy to refit the Surprise. As a personal reward, they allow him to transport jewels as freight, which will earn him a good prize upon his arrival in England. During the refit, Canning finds Maturin in the company of Villiers. In a fit of jealousy Canning slaps Maturin, and Maturin challenges him to a duel. Canning intends to kill Maturin but wounds him. Conversely, Maturin intends to wound Canning but kills him. Maturin convinces Villiers to return to England on a merchant ship that will leave immediately, rather than tend to him as he recovers aboard the Surprise. With the help of Aubrey and M'Allister, Maturin stoically operates on himself, removing the bullet lodged near his heart. Aubrey tends to his friend in the worst period of fever, where the secretive man speaks all his secrets.

Aubrey sends a note to Sophia, asking her to meet at Madeira, knowing he can clear his debts. In port, Maturin finds that Villiers left him a note returning the ring he gave her, and travelled with Mr Johnstone from America, who had visited her in Calcutta. Sophia is not there. Within a day's sailing, Aubrey overtakes the frigate HMS Ethalion under Heneage Dundas and finds that Sophia is aboard. She promises to marry him once they return to England.

Characters

See also Recurring characters in the Aubrey–Maturin series

 Jack Aubrey: Captain in the Royal Navy on HMS Lively, and then appointed Captain of HMS Surprise.
 Stephen Maturin: Ship's surgeon, physician, natural philosopher, intelligence agent and close friend to Aubrey.
 Sophia Williams: Young beautiful woman promised to Jack Aubrey, of good family and good marriage settlement.
 Mrs Williams: Sophia's mother, a woman of unpleasant ways who wants her daughters well married.
 Cecelia and Frances Williams: Younger sisters of Sophia, each married before the Surprise reaches Bombay. Frances marries Sir Oliver Floode, MP, and Cecelia marries his younger cousin, a militia officer.
 Diana Villiers: Cousin to Sophia who escapes the Williams household to be kept by Canning, and who is the love of Stephen Maturin.
 Mr Hincksey: Reverend who lives near Mapes Court, visiting often. Mrs Williams pushes Sophia to marry him instead of her fiancé Aubrey. Instead, he officiates at the weddings of Cecelia and Frances. He is a friend to Rev Mr White.
 Sir Joseph Blaine: Head of naval intelligence, entomologist, and Maturin's contact.
 Mr Waring: Assistant to Sir Joseph and his likely successor upon Blaine's retirement.
 Mr Simmons: First lieutenant on HMS Lively, who is effective in the actions taking out French shore batteries, the destruction of French stores ship Dromadaire and taking the French gunboat, with its current signal book. The gunboat is used to retrieve Maturin from torture in Port Mahon. He told Aubrey of the engagement announced in The Times and of the gift the Livelys will give him and Sophia.
 Mr Randall: Second lieutenant on HMS Lively.
 Lord Garron: Third lieutenant on HMS Lively. He is met again in The Mauritius Command as captain of a brig in the action, at which point he has inherited the title "Lord Narborough", which suggests that "Lord Garron" was his courtesy title as the eldest son of a peer.
 Mr Fielding: Lieutenant on HMS Lively.
 Mr John Dashwood: Lieutenant on HMS Lively.
 Joan Maragall: Catalan friend of Maturin who leads Aubrey to him on Port Mahon.
 Captain Dutourd: The lead French interrogator and torturer at Port Mahon, and the one who escaped death when Aubrey rescued the prisoners. Possibly killed by the other prisoners after he left the building.
 Mr Hervey: First lieutenant on HMS Surprise until Bombay, where he joins his uncle, an admiral, for likely promotion. He does his work, but does not have the authority needed for best operation of the ship.
 Mr Stourton: First lieutenant replacing Hervey, more qualified for his role, especially during the action with Linois.
 Mr Nicolls: Second lieutenant aboard Surprise. He rows Maturin out to St Paul's Rocks. When the fierce storm hits, Maturin survives, but there is no trace of Nicolls or the boat. Before the storm, he tells Maturin of his troubles with his wife, who has not written to him to end the argument they had.
 Tom Pullings: Lieutenant in the Royal Navy, third of the Surprise, and considered a follower of Captain Aubrey. He is married now. His experience during the peace aboard East Indiamen serves HMS Surprise well as she nears Sunda Strait and Sumatra.
 Mr Babbington: Midshipman who is nearing his time to pass for lieutenant as Surprise slowly makes her way south in the Atlantic Ocean. He is appointed acting lieutenant when the second lieutenant is lost in the storm. He is always seeking female companions in port, sometimes leaving the ship without permission.
 Mr Callow: One of the young men in the midshipmen's berth. In the action against Linois, a block falls on his head, which he survives.
 Barret Bonden: Aubrey's coxswain, who learns to write by lessons from Maturin on the Surprise sailing in the Atlantic.
 Preserved Killick: Aubrey's steward.
 Mr M'Alister: Assistant surgeon to Stephen Maturin in sick room, and in Maturin's surgery on himself.
 Mr Stanhope: Sent as ambassador to the Sultan of Kampong, the reason for Aubrey's mission on the Surprise.
 Mr Atkins: Secretary to Mr Stanhope, then in the employ of Canning upon reaching Calcutta, an agent for Maturin.
 Reverend Mr White: Parson in Stanhope's party. He alone stays on HMS Surprise after Stanhope dies, and they encounter the East Indiamen offering faster return to England for the cost of passage.
 Dil: Girl about 10 years old, Maturin's exuberant Indian guide in Bombay who is killed for the silver bangles Maturin gave her.
 Richard Canning: Rich Jewish merchant, Diana Villier's protector in India. He is married to another woman who plans to meet him in Calcutta. Canning encounters Maturin in Bombay and again in Calcutta.
 Charles-Alexandre Léon Durand Linois: French Admiral aboard Marengo, in charge of the French squadron.
 General Aubrey: Father of Jack Aubrey. He brings his wife and son to visit Sophia, unannounced, fortunately when her mother was not home.
 Mrs Aubrey: Second wife of General Aubrey, previously a dairy maid at the family estate of Woolcombe.
 Philip Aubrey: Son born to General Aubrey by his second wife, as mentioned in previous novel Post Captain.
 Mr Johnstone of America: Man who Villiers joined in Madeira (called "Mr. Johnson" in later books).
 Heneage Dundas: Captain in the Royal Navy and close friend to Aubrey, carries Sophia to meet him near Madeira.

Ships
The British:

HMS Surprise – frigate

China fleet
Addington – Indiaman
Ocean – Indiaman
Camden – Indiaman
Bombay Castle – Indiaman
Alfred – Indiaman
Wexwood – Indiaman
Lushington – Indiaman
Royal George – Indiaman

The French:

Marengo – 74-gun ship of the line commanded by Linois
Berceau – 22-gun corvette
Semillante – 36-gun frigate
Belle Poule – 40-gun frigate

Allusions to literature and events in history

Allusions to literature

The capture of the Spanish treasure fleet features in Hornblower and the Hotspur, 1962, the last-published full-length novel in C. S. Forester's Hornblower series. Forester adds Hornblower in the Hotspur as an extra to the five British ships in the squadron sent to intercept the fleet.

Allusions to events in history

At the opening of the novel, the Admiralty discusses what to do with the Spanish gold seized by the convoy including Captain Jack Aubrey and Stephen Maturin. In the previous novel, the fictional characters assumed they would get a share of what they seized, as was usual. The huge amount of the gold led the Admiralty to see this otherwise, as in the novel.

Aubrey gains command of HMS Surprise, a fictional version based on the historical HMS Surprise, but with a different back story. She becomes the most important fictional ship in the Aubrey–Maturin series.

The "cutting out" (capturing while in port, either at anchor or berthed) of HMS Hermione refers to an actual event involving HMS Surprise in 1799.

The capture of the Spanish treasure fleet, with Jack in command of HMS Lively, is based on the 1804 Battle of Cape Santa Maria (battle recounted in Post Captain).

Aubrey's attack on the French squadron is a fictionalisation of the 1804 Battle of Pulo Aura.

Reviews
Valerie Webster writing in The Scotsman found that "His books can absorb and enthral landlubbers like myself who do not even know the difference between a jib-boom and a taffrail."

Library Journal reviewed this novel as part of an abridged audio edition, finding "superb depictions of life" and highly recommended it, mentioning "O'Brian's exquisitely accurate historical detail". Mark Pumphrery, writing for Library Journal, remarks the friendship of the Aubrey and Maturin, which "plays out against an expanse of ocean, from India to the Atlantic, with a full complement of battles and adventures at sea for devotees of naval fiction."

Publishers Weekly liked the plot but, unlike the other reviewers, found the nautical detail sometimes overwhelming. They enjoy seeing the environment through Maturin's eyes, and appreciate what drives Aubrey to engage with French admiral Linois, as Aubrey wants enough prize money to marry his true love. In sum, "Stretching its genre but never escaping it, the novel will impress those who enjoy swashbucklers."

Helen Lucy Burk writing in the Irish Press said "Few, very few, books have made my heart thud with excitement. H.M.S. Surprise managed it. I read it cruising through the tame Adriatic, and several times found myself forced to pace about the deck to calm my pulse....Patrick O'Brian's erudition is phenomenal, as is his capacity for creating another completely believable world. He convinces with his total accuracy even in tiny details."

Adaptations
The novel was adapted in three parts in the Afternoon Play strand on BBC Radio 4, adapted by Roger Danes and directed and produced by Bruce Young, with Aubrey played by David Robb and Maturin by Richard Dillane. The rest of the cast was:

Preserved Killick – Jon Glover
Barret Bonden – David Timson
Sir Joseph Blaine – Struan Rodger
Sophie Williams – Liz Sutherland
Lieutenant Pullings – David Holt
Lieutenant Simmons – Dan Starkey
Mrs Williams / Lady Forbes – Lesley Nichols
Cecilia Williams / Miss Agatha – Sarah Danes
Diana Villiers – Adjoa Andoh
Arthur Stanhope – David Timson
Midshipman Callow – Carl Prekopp
Tobias Atkins – Stephen Critchlow
Lieutenant Nichols – Dan Starkey
Midshipman Babbington – Chris Pavlo
Canning – Chris Pavlo

The novel was one of the books in the series adapted into the film Master and Commander: The Far Side of the World.

Publication history

1973, USA, J. B. Lippincott, hardback  / 978-0-397-00998-5 (USA edition)
1973, UK, Collins hardback First UK edition 
1976, Fontana; Paperback edition 
1989 Fontana Press paperback  / 978-0-00-614181-5 (UK edition)
1991, May W. W. Norton paperback  / 978-0-393-30761-0 (USA edition)
1992 Recorded Books audio CD, narrator Patrick Tull  / 978-1-4025-2828-6 (USA edition)
1993, February ISIS Audio Books audio cassette  / 978-1-85089-876-4 (UK edition)
1994, November W. W. Norton & Company; Hardcover Reprint edition  / 978-0-393-03703-6 (USA edition)
1995, November Bespoke Audio audio cassette  / 978-1-86051-005-2 (UK edition)
1997, January HarperCollins paperback  / 978-0-00-649917-6 (UK edition)
1997, April Firebird Distributing audio cassette, narrator Robert Hardy  / 978-0-00-105331-1 (UK edition)
1998, January HarperCollins hardback  / 978-0-397-00998-5 (UK edition)
1998, August Random House Audio audio cassette  / 978-0-375-40524-2 (USA edition)
2000, June Thorndike Press; Largeprint hardcover edition  / 978-0-7862-1934-6 (USA edition)
2000, June Chivers Large Print paperback  / 978-0-7540-2350-0 (UK edition)
2001, September Recorded Books audio cassette  / 978-1-4025-0222-4 (USA edition)
2002, HarperCollins; reprint paperback edition 
2002, January Chivers Large Print hardback  / 978-0-7540-1460-7 (UK edition)
2002, September Soundings Audio audio CD  / 978-1-84283-262-2 (UK edition)
2004, March Blackstone Audiobooks Audio CD edition  / 978-1-4159-0399-5 (USA edition)
2004, April Blackstone Audio MP3 CD audio  / 978-0-7861-8562-7 (USA edition)
2004, April Blackstone Audio audio CD Library edition  / 978-0-7861-8633-4 (USA edition)
2004, July Books on Tape audio CD  / 978-1-4159-0400-8 (USA edition)
2007 Harper paperback  / 978-0-00-725585-6 (UK edition)
2011, W. W. Norton & Company; e-book edition 
2013, August Blackstone Audio audio CD, reader Simon Vance  / 978-1-4829-5512-5 (USA edition)

This novel was first published by Lippincott in the US and Collins in the UK, both in 1973. W W Norton issued a reprint in the USA 21 years after the initial publication as part of its reissue in paperback of all the novels in the series prior to 1991. Except for the 1973 Collins hardback and 1976 Fontana paperback UK editions above, the list of editions is drawn from Fantastic Fiction.

The process of reissuing the novels initially published prior to 1991 was in full swing in 1991, as the whole series gained a new and wider audience, as Mark Howowitz describes in writing about The Nutmeg of Consolation, the fourteenth novel in the series and initially published in 1991.

Two of my favourite friends are fictitious characters; they live in more than a dozen volumes always near at hand. Their names are Jack Aubrey and Stephen Maturin, and their creator is a 77-year-old novelist named Patrick O'Brian, whose 14 books about them have been continuously in print in England since the first, "Master and Commander," was published in 1970.

O'Brian's British fans include T. J. Binyon, Iris Murdoch, A. S. Byatt, Timothy Mo and the late Mary Renault, but, until recently, this splendid saga of two serving officers in the British Royal Navy during the Napoleonic Wars was unavailable in this country, apart from the first few instalments which went immediately out of print. Last year, however, W. W. Norton decided to reissue the series in its entirety, and so far nine of the 14 have appeared here, including the most recent chapter, The Nutmeg of Consolation.

References

Bibliography

External links
Maps for HMS Surprise

1973 British novels
Aubrey–Maturin series
British novels adapted into films
William Collins, Sons books